Buddha Vihara is a  Buddhist temple and spiritual center in Kalaburagi, Karnataka, India.

History
Buddha Vihara is  place for Buddhists. Situated in Kalaburagi, a city in the Indian state of Karnataka. It started on 7 January 2007. The Buddha Vihar complex blends architectural features of eminent Buddhist centers of Sanchi, Sarnath, Ajanta and Nagpur and has been constructed conforming to traditional Buddhist architecture.

References

Buddhist sites in Karnataka
Buddhist temples in Karnataka
Stupas in India
Kalaburagi
Buildings and structures in Kalaburagi district